Atopostipes is a Gram-positive, non-spore-forming, facultatively anaerobic and non-motile bacterial genus from the family of Carnobacteriaceae, with one known species (Atopostipes suicloacalis).

References

Further reading 
 

 

Lactobacillales
Monotypic bacteria genera
Bacteria genera